Plectritis ciliosa is a species of flowering plant in the honeysuckle family known by the common name longspur seablush. It is native to western North America from Washington to Baja California and Arizona, where it is a common plant in mountains, valleys, and coastal habitat types. It is an annual herb growing erect to a maximum height between 50 and 80 centimeters. The widely spaced, paired and oppositely arranged leaves are oval or somewhat oblong, smooth-edged, and up to 3 centimeters long by 1 wide. The upper ones lack petioles. The inflorescence is a dense headlike cluster of flowers in shades of bright to pale pink with two darker pink dots on the lower lip. Each flower has a long, slender spur extending downward from the front of the corolla.

External links
Jepson Manual Treatment
Washington Burke Museum
Photo gallery

Valerianoideae